The Diocese of Grass Valley now a titular see, was formerly a residential diocese of the Catholic Church located in northeastern California, United States. The diocese also included most of Nevada, and, early in its history, Utah and part of Colorado.

History
The particular church that became the Diocese of Grass Valley was erected in by Pope Pius IX in 1860 as the Vicariate Apostolic of Marysville from territory formerly belonging to the Archdiocese of San Francisco, of which it was a suffragan see. In 1868, the see city was changed to Grass Valley, and the vicariate was renamed and elevated by Pius IX to a diocese.

St. Joseph Church in Marysville served as the pro-cathedral of the vicarate. When the vicarate was elevated to a diocese, Bishop Eugene O'Connell resisted the change of see city to Grass Valley, and continued using St. Joseph's as his pro-cathedral. St. Patrick Cathedral in Grass Valley was the official cathedral approved by the Vatican.

The diocese served the large mining population in the Sierra Nevada during the California Gold Rush. By 1886, commercial mining in the Gold Country had slowed considerably, significantly reducing the population in the area, and the diocese was suppressed. Much of its territory became part of the Diocese of Sacramento.

Second diocesan bishop
On July 27, 1880 Bishop Patrick Manogue was appointed as coadjutor bishop of the Grass Valley Diocese. On May 24, 1884, Manogue succeeded O’Connell as the second and last diocesan bishop of Grass Valley. Manogue served two years as the final diocesan bishop.

Suppression of diocese
On May 28, 1886 this diocese was suppressed when the Diocese of Sacramento was erected. Manogue became its founding bishop and in effect the second bishop of the Sacramento diocese.

Restoration
In 1997, Pope John Paul II restored the see as a titular see. The current titular bishop of Grass Valley is Christie Macaluso, an auxiliary bishop of the Archdiocese of Hartford.

Ordinaries

Vicar Apostolic of Marysville
Eugene O'Connell (1860–1868)

Bishop of Grass Valley
Eugene O’Connell (1868–1884)
Patrick Manogue (1884–1886)

Titular Bishop of Grass Valley
Christie Macaluso (1997–present)

Further reading
Dwyer, John T. (1976); Condemned to the mines: The life of Eugene O'Connell, 1815-1891, pioneer bishop of Northern California and Nevada;

See also
 List of Catholic titular sees

References

Grass Valley
Grass Valley
California Gold Rush
Catholic Church in California
Catholic Church in Nevada
Catholic Church in Utah
Catholic Church in Colorado
Grass Valley
1886 disestablishments in the United States
Grass Valley
1860 establishments in California